William Hobbs or Bill Hobbs may refer to:

William Hobbs (politician) (1822–1890), doctor and politician in colonial Queensland
William Herbert Hobbs (1864–1952), geologist
Bill Hobbs (baseball) (1893–1945), shortstop in Major League Baseball
William G. Hobbs (1927–2012), Canadian artist
William Hobbs (choreographer) (1939–2018), choreographer of staged fights
Bill Hobbs (American football) (1946–2004), American football player
Bill Hobbs (rower) (1949–2020), American rower